William Sheffield may refer to:

William Sheffield (judge), American attorney and judge
William Paine Sheffield Sr., U.S. Representative and Senator from Rhode Island
William Paine Sheffield Jr., U.S. Representative from Rhode Island
William Sheffield (fl. 1407–1421) for Rutland (UK Parliament constituency)
William Sheffield (died 1646), MP for Hedon, 1614 and Thirsk (UK Parliament constituency), 1624
Will Sheffield (born 2000), English cricketer
Bill Sheffield (1928–2022), American politician and former governor of Alaska